Yakpabo-Sakassou is a town in central Ivory Coast. It is a sub-prefecture of Tiébissou Department in Bélier Region, Lacs District.

Yakpabo-Sakassou was a commune until March 2012, when it became one of 1126 communes nationwide that were abolished.

In 2014, the population of the sub-prefecture of Yakpabo-Sakassou was 12,220.

Villages
The 20 villages of the sub-prefecture of Yakpabo-Sakassou and their population in 2014 are:

References

Sub-prefectures of Bélier
Former communes of Ivory Coast